The  is a railway line in Hokkaido operated by Hokkaido Railway Company (JR Hokkaido), between Oshamambe Station in Oshamambe and Iwamizawa Station in Iwamizawa, approximately paralleling the coast of Iburi Subprefecture. There also is a branch line within Muroran, between Higashi-muroran and Muroran Station.

The  section between Shiraoi and Numanohata is the longest straight railway section in Japan.

On 19 November 2016, JR Hokkaido's President announced plans to rationalise the network by up to 1,237 km, or ~50% of the current network, including the proposed conversion to Third Sector operation of the Tomakomai - Iwamizawa section of the Muroran Main Line. However, if local governments do not come up with an agreement, the section may face closure.

Basic data
Operators, distances
Hokkaido Railway Company (Services and tracks)
From Oshamambe to Iwamizawa: 211.0 km
From Higashi-Muroran to Muroran: 7.0 km
Japan Freight Railway Company (Services)
From Oshamambe to Iwamizawa: 211.0 km
Track:
Double: 181.8 km
From Oshamambe to Tōya: 41.5 km
From Usu to Nagawa: 4.9 km
From Mareppu to Mikawa: 118.2 km
From Yuni to Kuriyama: 5.1 km
From Muroran to Higashi-Muroran: 7.0 km
Single: the remainder
Electric supply:
From Muroran, via Higashi-Muroran to Numanohata: 74.9 km (20,000 V AC)
Other sections are not electrified.
Block system: Automatic

Services

The section between Oshamambe and Numanohata is the part of the main link route between Sapporo and Hakodate. As such, the limited express trains Super Hokuto and Hokuto run between two cities once per 1 to 2 hours, as well as Suzuran between Sapporo and Muroran.

The last section was once an important freight route, but became a quiet local line after coal mines closed.

Former services
Prior to the opening of the Hokkaido Shinkansen, there were also sleeping car trains between Honshu and Hokkaido, such as the Hokutosei, Cassiopeia, Twilight Express, and Hamanasu.

Stations
Some local trains may skip Koboro (marked "◌").

Branch Line

Rolling stock

Local  
KiHa 40 series DMUs
KiHa 143 DMUs (Oshamambe to Numanohata)
KiHa 150 DMUs (Oshamambe to Tomakomai)
711 series EMUs (until 26 October 2012)
737 series EMUs (Tomakomai to Muroran, from spring 2023)

Limited express
 Suzuran
 785 series AC EMUs
 789 series AC EMUs
 Super Hokuto
 KiHa 281 series DMUs
 KiHa 261-1000 series DMUs
 Hokuto
 KiHa 183 series DMUs

History
In 1892, the Hokkaido Colliery and Railway Company opened the line from Muroran (now Higashi-Muroran) to Iwamizawa. The line was built to link coal mines in the Iwamizawa-Asahikawa region and Muroran Port. The line was extended to the current Muroran in 1897. The Japanese Government nationalised the Hokkaido Colliery Railway in 1906, and the Higashi-Muroran - Muroran section was double-tracked in 1910.

The line was built to bypass the mountainous section of the Hakodate Main Line, as well as to link the inland Iburi to the Muroran Port. The two lines were merged into one in 1931, and renamed the Muroran Main Line, with the Higashi-Muroran - Muroran section becoming known as the branchline. In 1935, a rail motor service was established on the branchline.

Initially, the line mainly functioned as a freight line. However, with the reduction in coal being mined, from the 1960s the line's main traffic shifted to passengers. At present, all the intercity express trains between Sapporo and Hakodate operate over the Chitose and Muroran lines to Oshamambe, bypassing the north section of the Hakodate Main Line route.

The last steam locomotive hauled regular service ran between Iwamizawa and Muroran in 1975.

Duplication
Growing coal traffic on the Iwamizawa - Muroran section resulted in the double-tracking of the 101 km Higashi-Muroran - Mikawa section in stages between 1920 and 1958. The 7 km Iwamizawa - Shibun section was double-tracked in 1961, but returned to single track in 1994. The 9 km Yuni - Kurioka section was doubled between 1968 and 1969, but the 4 km Kuriyama - Kurioka section became single track in 1990 as a result of the collapse of a tunnel.

The 42 km Oshamambe - Toya section was double-tracked between 1964 and 1975, involving the construction of ten new tunnels and realignments that reduced the route length by 1.7 km. Several of the abandoned single-track tunnels can be seen in this section.

The Usu - Nagawa section was double-tracked in 1968, and the Mareppu - Higashi-Muroran section was doubled in stages between 1968 and 1978, with five new tunnels and realignments shortening the route by 0.8 km.

Electrification
The Numanohata - Muroran section was electrified in 1980 in conjunction with the electrification of the Chitose Line to Sapporo.

Former connecting lines

 Toya station - A 9 km private line electrified at 600 V DC connected to Toyako, operating from 1929 until 1941.
 Date Monbetsu station - The Ibura line from Kutchan on the Hakodate Main Line was extended to Date Monbetsu between 1940 and 1941, and closed in 1986.
 Noboribetsu station - In 1915, a  gauge horse-drawn line opened to an onsen hot spring resort 9 km away. A steam locomotive was introduced in 1918, halving the journey time to 1 hour. The line was converted to  gauge and electrified at 600 V DC in 1925, reducing the journey to 35 minutes, but the line closed due to the economic depression in 1933.
 Tomakomai station - The Oji Paper Co. built a  gauge line a total distance of 35 km from 1908 to construct a series of hydro-electric power stations which opened in 1910, 1916, 1918, and 1919. In 1922, a summer-only tourist service was introduced, patronised by the Japanese Emperor. In 1934, the 8 kg/m rail was replaced with 10 kg/m rail, and in 1936 the passenger service became year-round. A fifth power station was opened in 1941, and the line was replaced by buses in 1951.
 Numanohata station - The Hokkaido Coal Co. opened a 70 km line to a coal mine near Hobetsu between 1922 and 1923. The line was nationalised in 1943, and a 3.6 km connecting line built from Mukawa to the line, with the Hidaka Main Line becoming the route to the Muroran Port, and the initial 24 km section to Numanohata closing.
 Hayakita station - A horse-drawn timber tramway was opened to Atsuma (8 km) in 1904, and extended a further 10 km to Horonoi in 1927. Petrol locomotives were introduced in 1931. The Horonoi - Atsuma section closed in 1948, with the remainder closing in 1951.
 Kuriyama station - The Hokkaido Colliery and Steamship Co. built a 34 km line from Kuriyama (including a bridge over the line) to Yubari in 1926, including a switch-back (or zig-zag) section at Nishikisawa. A 23 km extension opened from Kuriyama - Nopporo (on the Hakodate Main Line 18 km east of Sapporo) in 1930. At its peak in 1965, the line carried 1.5 million tonnes of coal and another 0.5 million tonnes of general freight annually, as well as 2 million passengers. The entire line closed in 1975 after the closure of the mine in 1972. A 4.7 km branch to the Tsunoda mine operated from 1927 until 1970.
 Shibun station - A 24 km line to a coal mine at Manjitanzan opened in 1914, with passenger services provided from 1924. The mine closed in 1978, and the line closed in 1985. A 3 km horse-drawn line opened to the Hokusei coal mine in 1920, with a steam locomotive and passenger carriages introduced in 1946. The line and mine closed in 1967.

See also
Hakodate Main Line
Chitose Line
List of railway lines in Japan

References

 
Rail transport in Hokkaido
Railway lines opened in 1892